Tranmere Rovers Football Club is an English association football club based in Birkenhead, Wirral. Founded in 1884, they played their first games under the name Belmont F.C.; in 1885, before the start of their second season, they adopted the name Tranmere Rovers. In 1889, Tranmere entered the West Lancashire League, and progressed through the Combination, the Lancashire Combination and the Central League. On 27 August 1921, as founder members of Division Three North, they won their first Football League match 4–1 against Crewe Alexandra at Prenton Park. Tranmere played in the Football League ever since then, with the exception of the war years 1939-1946, and right up until 2015 at which time they were relegated from the Football League down to the National League. Their highest league finish was fourth in the First Division which, at the time, was the second tier of the league pyramid, in the 1992–93 season.

Ray Mathias spent his entire playing career from 1964 to 1984 at Tranmere, making a record 637 appearances in all competitions. Mathias went on to manage the team in 2002. Harold Bell made a record 595 league appearances for Tranmere. Bell also holds the record for the most consecutive league appearances for a British team; he was picked for the first game after the Second World War in the 1946–47 season and did not miss a match until 30 August 1955, a total of 401 consecutive matches in the Third Division North.

Jimmy Moreton made 148 Football League and 22 FA Cup appearances, as well numerous first-team outings in the lower Lancashire Combination and Central Leagues. Upon his retirement in 1926, Moreton became first trainer, then manager of Rovers. As of the end of the 2011–12 season, the most recent player to amass 100 appearances is Ash Taylor.

Ian Muir's tally of 180 goals in 393 appearances makes him Tranmere's leading scorer. John Aldridge scored 174 goals in 294 games, and became player-manager in 1995.

Players 
This list contains players who have made 100 or more appearances in nationally organised first-team competition for Tranmere. It includes first-team appearances and goals in the Football League and play-offs, the FA Cup, the Football League Cup, the Third Division North Cup, the Football League Trophy, the Full Members Cup and the Anglo-Italian Cup. Appearances and goals in other competitions or non-competitive matches are not included. Statistics from the three games in the 1939–40 Football League season abandoned because of the Second World War, and the two games against Accrington Stanley in 1961–62, prior to Accrington's resignation from the Football League, have been expunged from the records and are not included. Between 1939 and 1946, Tranmere played 277 games in wartime regional league and cup competitions, but these results are considered friendly matches and are also omitted. Statistics for current players are correct to the end of the 2011–12 season.

Notes

References 

General

  .

 

 

 

 

Specific

Players
 
Tranmere Rovers
Association football player non-biographical articles